Khevra may refer to:

Chevra, alternative spelling
Khevra, Pakistan, a city in Pakistan